Chuka may refer to:

Places
Chuka, Kenya, a town
Chuka, Tibet, a village
 Thak, a village in Kumaon division, Uttarakhand, India
 Chuka man-eating tiger, a man-eating tiger that operated around the village in Kumaon

People
Chuka Umunna (born 1978), British Liberal Democrat politician and former Member of Parliament 
Chuka Odom (born 1960), Nigerian lawyer and politician
Chuka Momah, Nigerian sport reporter and administrator
Stefano Okaka Chuka (born 1989), Italian football player
Derick 'Chuka' Ogbu (born 1990), Nigerian football player
Rhema 'Chuka' Obed (born 1991), English-born football player

Other
Chuka (film), a 1967 western starring Rod Taylor
Chuka (food), Japanese style Chinese food

See also
 Chukka (disambiguation)